Toko University (TOKO) was a private university located in Puzi City, Chiayi County, Taiwan.

History
The university was founded in 2001. In 2019, the university had only 37.23% of enrollment rate. In May 2020, the university announced its planning of closure due to low enrollment. In July 2020, the Ministry of Education rejected the university's plan to close down. In May 2021, the university filled an application again for closing down to the ministry and on 23 June 2021, the ministry announced that the university would close down on 31 July 2021.

Faculties
 College of Technology and Design
 College of Economy and Management
 College of Human Ecology
 Center for General Education

Alumni
 Yu Cheng-ta, Speaker of Chiayi County Council

See also
 List of universities in Taiwan

References

External links

 Toko University 

2001 establishments in Taiwan
2021 disestablishments in Taiwan
Defunct universities and colleges in Taiwan
Educational institutions disestablished in 2021
Educational institutions established in 2001